The 2014–15 Saint Louis Billikens women's basketball team represented the Saint Louis University during the 2014–15 college basketball season. Lisa Stone assumes the responsibility as head coach for her third season. The Billikens were members of the Atlantic 10 Conference and play their home games at the Chaifetz Arena. They finished the season 15–16, 7–9 in A-10 play to finish in a tie for eighth place. They advanced to the quarterfinals of the A-10 women's tournament where they lost to George Washington.

2014–15 media
All non-televised Billikens home games and conference road games will stream on the A-10 Digital Network.

Roster

Schedule

|-
!colspan=9 style="background:#0000FF; color:#FFFFFF;"| Exhibition

|-
!colspan=9 style="background:#FFFFFF; color:#0000FF;"| Regular Season

|-
!colspan=9 style="background:#0000FF; color:#FFFFFF;"| Atlantic 10 Tournament

Rankings
2014–15 NCAA Division I women's basketball rankings

See also
 2014–15 Saint Louis Billikens men's basketball team
 Saint Louis Billikens women's basketball

References

Saint Louis Billikens women's basketball seasons
Saint Louis